is a railway station on the Muroran Main Line of Hokkaido Railway Company (JR Hokkaido) located in Noboribetsu, Hokkaidō, Japan. The station is assigned the station number H30.

The station was opened by Hokkaido Colliery and Railway Company on August 1, 1892 when the line between Higashi-Muroran Station and Iwamizawa Station opened.

Noboribetsu City Hall is located adjacent to Horobetsu Station.

Adjacent stations

References 

Railway stations in Japan opened in 1892
Railway stations in Hokkaido Prefecture